The 1997–98 Davidson Wildcats men's basketball team represented Davidson College in NCAA men's Division I competition during the 1997–98 NCAA Division I men's basketball season. Lead by head coach Bob McKillop, the team played its home games at Belk Arena. The Wildcats finished atop the Southern Conference regular season standings and won the Southern Conference tournament to receive an automatic bid to the NCAA tournament as No. 14 seed in the Southeast region. Davidson finished win an overall record of 20–10 (13–2 SoCon).

Roster

Schedule and results

|-
!colspan=9 style=| Regular season

|-
!colspan=9 style=| SoCon Tournament

|-
!colspan=9 style=| NCAA Tournament

References

Davidson Wildcats men's basketball seasons
Davidson
Southern Conference men's basketball champion seasons
Davidson Wildcats men's b
Davidson Wildcats men's b
Davidson